is the full-length debut album by v-u-den, the Hello! Project-associated Japanese pop trio led by former Morning Musume and Tanpopo member Rika Ishikawa. Meant to commemorate the band's first anniversary as a unit, the release date actually came 13 months after the release of their first single. It contains all five of the band's single A-sides — "Koi no Nukegara", "Kacchoiize! JAPAN", "Ajisai Ai Ai Monogatari", "Hitorjime", and "Kurenai no Kisetsu" — plus several songs (and two opening and closing skits) centered on the "hotel room" concept of the album.

The album caps a prolific year for Ishikawa, who in the 13 months between V-u-den's first single and the release of the album, had also recorded three final singles and one last studio album (Ai no Dai 6 Kan) with Morning Musume, done one-off singles with fellow Morning Musume member Sayumi Michishige under the name Ecomoni, and with Maki Goto, Natsumi Abe and Aya Matsuura under the name DEF.DIVA, and became the de facto host of Hello! Project's Japanese TV show Hello! Morning.  This activity may have had something to do with the lengthy wait for V-u-den's first full-length album to see the light of day.

CD track listing 
 チェックイン (Check In)
 カッチョイイゼ！JAPAN (Kacchoiize! JAPAN)
 愛～スイートルーム～ (Ai ~Suite Room~)
 紫陽花アイ愛物語 (Ajisai Ai Ai Monogatari)
 恋のヌケガラ (Koi no Nukegara)
 Tea Break
 ひとりじめ (Hitorijime)
 クラクラ　ディナータイム (Kurakura Dinnertime)
 クレナイの季節 (Kurenai no Kisetsu)
 唇から愛をちょうだい (Kuchibiru Kara Ai wo Choudai)
 パジャマな時間 (Pajama na Jikan)
 まごころの道 (Magokoro no Michi)
 チェックアウト (Check Out)

Personnel
Rika Ishikawa - lead and backing vocals, spoken word
Erika Miyoshi - lead and backing vocals, spoken word
Yui Okada - lead and backing vocals, spoken word
Kotaro Egami - keyboards, drum and MIDI programming
MIT Studio - sound effects on "Check In" and "Check Out"
Hideyuki "Daichi" Suzuki - guitar, bass, keyboards, drum and MIDI programming
Hiroaki Takeuchi - backing vocals
Shouichiro Hirata - keyboards, drum and MIDI programming, backing vocals
Takanori Tsunoda - guitar, keyboards, drum and MIDI programming
Atsuko Inaba - backing vocals
Ogu - backing vocals
Akira - keyboards, drum and MIDI programming, backing vocals
Jun Abe - keyboards, drum and MIDI programming
Kenji Suzuki - guitar
Nao Tanaka - keyboards, drum and MIDI programming
Yuichi Takahashi - guitar, keyboards, drum and MIDI programming
Shunsuke Suzuki] - guitar, keyboards, drum and MIDI programming
Chino - backing vocals
Ian Hartley - spoken word
Kenny Scott - spoken word
Isabelle Bruckert - spoken word
Tsunku - composer, backing vocals

Recording personnel
Nobuyasu Umemoto - recording coordination
Kansuke Yamamoto - recording coordination
Kazumi Matsui - recording engineer, mix engineer
Shinnosuke Kobayashi - recording engineer
Ryo Wakizawa - mix engineer
Takeshi Yanagisawa - mix engineer
Hironobu Kitajima - mix engineer
Youhei Horiuchi - 2nd engineer
Mitsuko Koike - mastering engineer

V-u-den albums
Piccolo Town-King Records albums
2005 debut albums